The Villa Stuck, built in 1898 and established as a museum in 1992 and located in the Munich quarter of Bogenhausen, is a museum and historic house devoted to the life and work of the painter Franz Stuck.  In contrast to the Classical architecture of the exterior, Stuck decorated the interior in striking Art Nouveau/Art Deco style.

See also
 List of single-artist museums

Further reading 
All of the following references are in German.

 Enno Burmeister: Villa und Atelier Franz von Stuck in München-Bogenhausen. Baudokumentation. Arbeitshefte zur Denkmalpflege; 38. München: Burmeister 1990.
 Enno Burmeister: Villa und Atelier Franz von Stuck in München-Bogenhausen. Restaurierungskonzept, Kostenberechnung. Arbeitshefte zur Denkmalpflege; 39. Munich: Burmeister 1994.
 Eva Heilmann: Der Künstler und seine Villa. Künstlerisches Programm und Gesamtkunstwerk. Franz-von-Stuck-Geburtshaus Tettenweis; 29. Tettenweis: Förderkreis Franz-von-Stuck-Geburtshaus 1990.
 Birgit Jooss: Ateliers als Weihestätten der Kunst. Der „Künstleraltar“ um 1900. Munich 2002
 Fritz von Ostini: Villa Franz von Stuck München. Sonderdruck der Innendekoration. Darmstadt: A. Koch um 1900.
 Die Villa Stuck in München. Inszenierung eines Künstlerlebens. Munich 1992.
 Nicolette Baumeister: Architektur neues München - Münchner Baukultur 1994 - 2004, p. 102, Verlagshaus Braun, Berlin 2004. 
 Jo-Anne Birnie Danzker: Die Villa Stuck. Hatje Cantz, Ostfildern 2007. .

External links 
 
 Museum Official website of the Villa Stuck
 

Art museums and galleries in Munich
Biographical museums in Germany
Villas in Germany
Historic house museums in Germany
Houses completed in 1898
Art museums established in 1992
1992 establishments in Germany
Registered historic buildings and monuments in Bavaria
Stuck